Teresa M. Amabile (born June 15, 1950) is an American academic who is the Edsel Bryant Ford Professor of Business Administration in the Entrepreneurial Management Unit at Harvard Business School.

Biography

Amabile is primarily known for her research and writing on creativity, dating to the late 1970s. Originally educated as a chemist, Amabile received her doctorate in psychology from Stanford University in 1977. She now studies how everyday life inside organizations can influence people and their performance. Her research encompasses creativity, productivity, innovation, and inner work life – the confluence of emotions, perceptions, and motivation that people experience as they react to events at work.

Amabile's most recent discoveries appear in her book, The Progress Principle: Using Small Wins to Ignite Joy, Engagement, and Creativity at Work. Published in August 2011 by Harvard Business Review Press, the book is co-authored with Amabile’s husband and collaborator, Steven Kramer, Ph.D.

Amabile has published over 100 scholarly articles and chapters, in outlets including top journals in psychology (such as Journal of Personality and Social Psychology and American Psychologist) and in management (Administrative Science Quarterly, Academy of Management Journal). She is also the author of The Work Preference Inventory and KEYS to Creativity and Innovation. Amabile has used insights from her research in working with various groups in business, government, and education, including Procter & Gamble, Novartis International AG, Motorola, IDEO, and the Creative Education Foundation. She has presented her theories, research results, and practical implications in dozens of forums, including the World Economic Forum in Davos, the Young Presidents’ Organization annual university, and the Front End of Innovation annual conference.

At Harvard Business School, Amabile has taught MBA and executive courses on managing for creativity, leadership, and ethics. Previously, at Brandeis University, she taught social psychology, organizational psychology, the psychology of creativity, and statistics. She served as the host-instructor of the 26-part series, Against All Odds: Inside Statistics, originally broadcast on PBS.

Publications
Dr. Amabile is the author of The Progress Principle, Creativity in Context, and Growing Up Creative, as well as over 150 scholarly papers, chapters, case studies, and presentations. She serves on the editorial boards of Creativity Research Journal, Creativity and Innovation Management, and the Journal of Creative Behavior. Her papers include: Creativity (Annual Review of Psychology), Assessing the Work Environment for Creativity (Academy of Management Journal); Changes in the Work Environment for Creativity during Downsizing (Academy of Management Journal); Leader Behaviors and the Work Environment for Creativity: Perceived Leader Support (Leadership Quarterly); and Affect and Creativity at Work (Administrative Science Quarterly). She has also published several articles in Harvard Business Review.

References

Further reading
 
 
 
 
  Rasec Kun

External links
 The Progress Principle

Creativity researchers
Harvard Business School faculty
Stanford University School of Humanities and Sciences alumni
Brandeis University faculty
1950s births
Living people
20th-century American psychologists
American women psychologists
21st-century American psychologists